Playón Chico Airport  is an airport serving Ukupseni, an island in the San Blas Archipelago in the Guna Yala comarca (indigenous province) of Panama.

The airport is on the mainland, connected to the island by a bridge. North approach and departure are over the water.

Airlines and destinations

See also

Transport in Panama
List of airports in Panama

References

External links
 OpenStreetMap - Playón Chico
 Ukupseni/Playón Chico information on Minube
 Panoramio - Aerial view
 Panoramio - Aerial view
 

Airports in Panama
Guna Yala